Praevalitana (also Prevalitana, Prevaliana, Praevaliana or Prevalis) was a Late Roman province that existed between c. 284 and c. 600. It included parts of present-day Montenegro, northern Albania, and part of present-day Kosovo. Its capital city was Scodra.

History

Background 
The Roman Empire conquered the Adriatic-Balkanic region after the Third Illyrian War (168 BC), the Romans defeated Gentius, the last king of Illyria, at Scodra in 168 BC and captured him, bringing him to Rome in 165 BC. Four client-republics were set up, which were in fact controlled by Rome.
 
Later, Illyricum was directly governed by Rome and organized as a Roman province, with Scodra as its capital. Illyricum was split into two in 10 AD, Pannonia and Dalmatia. The province of Dalmatia spread inland to cover all of the Dinaric Alps and most of the eastern Adriatic coast, including all actual Montenegro.

Province 
The province of Praevalitana was established during the reign of Emperor Diocletian (r. 284–305) from the southeastern corner of the former province of Dalmatia and became part of the Diocese of Moesia (290-357), one of 12 dioceses created by Diocletian within his tetrarchy. It was named Praevalitana (the region before the valley) because it stood directly to the west of Kosovo field.

The Diocese of Moesia was later divided in two, the Diocese of Dacia in the north and the Diocese of Macedonia to the south. Praevalitana initially was part of the Diocese of Macedonia but later moved into the Diocese of Dacia (which comprised Dacia Mediterranea, Dacia Ripensis, Dardania and Moesia Prima), a subdivision of the Praetorian prefecture of Illyricum (395). A province of brief existence, ''Macedonia Salutaris, was divided between Praevalitana and Epirus Nova (412).

After the Western Roman Empire collapsed in 476, the region remained under the rule of the Eastern Roman Empire. In the 530s, Byzantine generals of Emperor Justinian I (r. 527–565) used Praevalitana as a base for military campaign against Ostrogoths in Dalmatia during the Gothic War.

Aftermath 
During the Migration Period, Praevalitana was overrun by invasions of the Avars and Slavs. In the 6th and 7th centuries, they destroyed main cities and overran much of the hinterland.

Cities 
The first written records of any kind of settlement in southern Dalmatia refer to the Roman province of Praevalitana and the Roman city of Birsiminium, which lived in the shadow of the Illyrian town of Doclea (Duklja), a large city by the standards of that time, boasting 8-10 thousand inhabitants and named after one of the two major Illyrian tribes inhabiting these parts, the "Docleatae". The Docleatae inhabited the fertile valley of the River Zeta, located along the vital link between the coastal and continental regions of Montenegro, which helped their swift economic rise.
 
The other tribe, the "Labeates", inhabited the entire area between Lake Skadar and modern Podgorica. They had their main fortification, called Metheon (known today as Medun), and very developed social and military systems in place.

From the 5th century, the settling of Slavic and Avaric tribes began in this area, always coupled with destructive raids on the native tribes and settlements. Doclea was not exempt from these violent raids, which would, eventually, along with natural disasters, lead to the complete obliteration of this once prosperous town. After the Slavic tribes settled in this area they established another settlement, which took over the role previously held by Doclea: it was named Ribnica (Podgorica). Native non-romanized (Albanian) population retreated in the Albanian highlands, while Acruvium (actual Kotor) on the coast survived the Slav attacks and prospered as a merchant city-state of the original romanized Illyrians until the 10th century. Other cities in the province included Anderva (Nikšić) and Risinium (Risan).

Ecclesiastical order 
During the existence of the province, its capital city of Scodra was also the main ecclesiastical center in the region. Bishop of Scodra held metropolitan jurisdiction over all other bishops within the province, including those of Dioclea and Lissus. In 431, metropolitan Senecio of Scodra participated at the Third Ecumenical Council, in Ephesus. In 535, the Metropolis of Scodra and its suffragan bishops came under jurisdiction of the newly created Archbishopric of Justiniana Prima. At the beginning of the 7th century, ecclesiastical order collapsed with the fall of the province.

References

Sources 

 
 
 
 
 
 
 

Late Roman provinces
Montenegro in the Roman era
Albania in the Roman era
Serbia in the Roman era